The Dongfeng Fengguang 330S is a compact MPV produced by Chinese auto maker Dongfeng-Sokon (DFSK), a subsidiary of Dongfeng Motor Co., Ltd.

Overview

The Fengguang 330S debuted during the 2017 Wuhan Commercial Auto Show and was launched on the Chinese car market in November 2017. The Dongfeng Fengguang 330S was based on the Dongfeng Fengguang 330 MPV. The 330S in essentially a restyled 330 positioned higher in the market and seats seven in a 2-3-2 configuration with prices starting from 45,900 yuan to 47,900 yuan.

References

External links
Fengguang 330S website

Compact MPVs
Cars introduced in 2017
Rear-wheel-drive vehicles
2010s cars
Minivans
Cars of China